"Stone Rolling" is a song by American rapper and singer Rod Wave, released on July 27, 2022 as the third single from his fourth studio album Beautiful Mind (2022). It was produced by TnTXD, SephGotTheWaves and Geo Vocals.

Composition
The song contains a morose beat driven by a guitar melody, over which Rod Wave sings about fulfilling his dreams of traveling to many places as a result of his fame and hoping for a future with no drugs and a beach house for his kids.

Music video
The music video was released alongside the single and was directed by Rod Wave himself. It finds him traveling from his hometown of St. Petersburg, Florida to many other U.S. cities, such as Baltimore and Miami, and also flying to Cancún, Mexico.

Charts

References

2022 singles
2022 songs
Rod Wave songs
Songs written by Rod Wave